Giuseppe Pellizoni, also called il Crescini, (1688–18th-century) was an Italian painter of the Baroque period, active mainly in Cremona and Lombardy as a quadratura painter.

Biography
He was born in Casalmaggiore, near Cremona. He was trained with Francesco Chiozzi. One of his pupils was Giuseppe Natali. He painted a canvas of Saints Biagio, Luca, and Pietro (1670) for the church of San Giovanni in Casalmaggiore. and for the church of Sant'Andrea in Mantua.

References

Year of birth unknown
Year of death unknown
17th-century Italian painters
Italian male painters
18th-century Italian painters
Quadratura painters
Painters from Cremona
18th-century Italian male artists